Guerrero Negro is the largest town located in the municipality of Mulegé in the Mexican state of Baja California Sur (BCS). It had a population of 14,316 in the 2015 census. The town is served by Guerrero Negro Airport.

Whale Festival 
The town has a celebration each year to hail the annual arrival of the gray whales that calve in the lagoons of Baja California Sur (BCS). This festival occurs during the first half of February. The port of San Blas, also in BCS, has a similar festival on February 24 and 25.

Saltworks operation 

Guerrero Negro was founded in 1957 when Daniel Ludwig built a salt works there to supply the demand of salt in the western United States. The salt mine was established around the Ojo de Liebre coastal lagoon to take advantage of its strong salinity. This company, called Exportadora de Sal, S.A., of C.V. ("Salt Exporters, Inc."), eventually became the greatest salt mine in the world, with a production of seven million tons of salt per year, exported to the main centers of consumption in the Pacific basin, especially Japan, Korea, the United States, Canada, Taiwan and New Zealand.

Ludwig also constructed the hotel Acapulco Princess in the port of Acapulco, Guerrero. In 1973, he sold the salt company to the Mexican government and the corporation Mitsubishi, 51% and 49% respectively. The company is distinguished not only by its growth and its yield, but also by the progress which has reached more than a thousand employees, their community and its ecological surroundings: The salt works, located in a site of extraordinary beauty, within a biosphere reserve, has been pivotal in the development of the region. Its economic success has contributed to environmental conservation, where each winter whales gather, many species of resident and migratory birds stay, visiting birds originating mainly in the United States and Europe.

Community 

The town was named Guerrero Negro when founded in 1957 after the Black Warrior, a U.S. American whaling ship from Duxbury, Massachusetts (near Boston). That ship, captained by Robert Brown, wrecked in what was then called Frenchman's Lagoon on December 20, 1858. The bay was later renamed after the ship. Contrary to a few sources, it was not named after the leader of the rebellion and early president of independent Mexico, Vicente Guerrero, the national hero who was of Mestizo and African ancestry, and sometimes called El Guerrero Negro. There is a town named Vicente Guerrero over 400 km (248 miles) north in Baja.

It was during this era that Captain Charles Melville Scammon discovered a prolific gray whale breeding lagoon; it became a choice hunting ground for American and European whalers. Although locally known as "Laguna Ojo de Liebre" ("eye of the jackrabbit"), this lagoon became known to English-speaking whale watchers and boaters from around the world as "Scammon's Lagoon."  Since the 20th century, a whale-watching industry has developed around the whales in the lagoon. Due to familiarity with humans, the whales that come to this lagoon are particularly known for their willingness to approach the whale-watching boats; sometimes the whales (especially the newborns) allow themselves to be petted by observers.

The town is on Federal Highway 1.

Demographics

Notable residents
Julio César González (1976-2012), professional boxer

See also
El Vizcaíno Biosphere Reserve

References 

 2010 census tables: INEGI: Instituto Nacional de Estadística, Geografia e Informática

External links
The World’s Largest Salt Works Is in Guerrero Negro 
Guerrero Negro Site
Exportadora de Sal
Guerrero Negro - What's In A Name?

Populated places in Baja California Sur